2012 Kabaddi World Cup was the third edition of the circle style Kabaddi World Cup, organised by the Government of Punjab. It was played in Punjab, India in various cities of the province from 1 to 15 December 2012 with teams from 16 countries. The opening ceremony of the tournament was held in Bathinda and the closing ceremony in Ludhiana.

The prize money for the winners of the third edition was doubled to  2 crore, while the runners-up received  1 crore. The team finishing at third position received  51 lakhs.

The Deputy Chief Minister Sukhbir Singh Badal said that dope testing would be mandatory for each player.

Ekamjeet was declared the best stopper and Gagandeep Gaggi was chosen as the best raider of the tournament.

Participating nations
The 15-day-long tournament had sixteen participating nations:

Pools
The 16 teams were divided into four pools of four teams each. Hosts India were placed in Pool A.

Venues
The games was played at the following venues.
 Yadvindra Public School Stadium, Patiala
 Lajwanti Stadium, Hoshiarpur
 Guru Nanak Stadium, Amritsar
 Sports Stadium, Doda, Sri Muktsar Sahib
 War Heroes Stadium, Sangrur
 Nehru Stadium, Rupnagar
 Sports Stadium, Chohla Sahib, Tarn Taran
 Government College Stadium, mansa
 N.M. Government College Stadium, Mansa
 Sports Stadium, Bathinda
 Guru Gobind Singh Stadium, Jalandhar
 Guru Nanak Stadium, Ludhiana
 M.R. Government College Stadium, Fazilka

Schedule
Note: All matches' timings are according to Indian Standard Time (UTC +5:30).

Group stage

Pool A

 Qualified for semifinals

Pool B

 Qualified for semifinals

Pool C

 Qualified for semifinals

Pool D

 Qualified for semifinals

Knockout stage

Semi-finals

Third place

Final

References 

2012 in Indian sport
Kabaddi World Cup
Sport in Punjab, India
International sports competitions hosted by India
December 2012 sports events in Asia